Chawa is a very old village in Bhera near the town of Bhera, Sargodha District, Pakistan.

The Bhalwana is the main family of this village. It's tehsil Bhalwal was named after the Great Grand father of the Bhalwana family, Bhullu.   .

The first district Nazim of Sargodha Malik Amjad Ali Noon was from a village named Ali Pur Noon.

Chawa produces a specific kind of plant that is used in the manufacture of colour paints.

References

Populated places in Sargodha District